Salzedas is a civil parish in the municipality of Tarouca, Portugal. The population in 2011 was 767 and population density was 86 inhabitants per square kilometre, in an area of 8.92 km2.

References

Freguesias of Tarouca